Black Thursday (Arabic: الخميس الأسود, French: Jeudi noir) was the massacre of between 30 and 50 Lebanese Christians in the area of Bashoura in West Beirut on May 30, 1975. This massacre was one of first of the widespread sectarian-based abductions, mutilations and executions that followed after the beginning of the Lebanese Civil War.

The massacre took place after a murder of a Palestinian man in downtown Beirut took place; officials estimate that between 30 and 50 Christian Lebanese civilians were summarily executed.

Aftermath and response 
The bodies were abandoned in a Muslim cemetery, with possible intension of provoking a sectarian message, close to the Green Line separating East and West Beirut, all with their genitals mutilated off.

Subsequently, the attack led gunmen, both leftist and right-wing militiamen, to block roads and streets in the areas under their respective authority, controlling traffic by only allowing people of certain sects to pass through. Many of the kidnapped victims (both Muslims and Christians) were executed, and those released were reported to have had parts of their bodies mutilated.

References

Massacres in Lebanon
Lebanese Civil War

Massacres of the Lebanese Civil War